Jordan Brown (born 14 August 1996) is an Australian football (soccer) player who currently plays as a central midfielder for Melbourne Victory in the National Youth League.

Early life 
Brown was born and raised in Melbourne, Australia. He attended Caulfield Grammar School where he played for their first XI, and his older sister Ashley also played for Melbourne Victory as a striker in the W-League.

Playing career
As a youth, Brown represented the Australian Joeys under-15 and under-17 sides, and played with the Australian Institute of Sport in the National Youth League.

In 2012 Brown at the age of 16 become the first Australian Jewish player to enter the A-League when he signed a three-year contract with the Melbourne Victory. Brown made his professional football and home debut for Melbourne Victory on 14 January 2014 against Western Sydney Wanderers at AAMI Park, coming on as a substitute for the final 9 minutes of the match. In 2014 he was at 60 kg the lightest player in the four sports of the Australian national leagues. He was released by Melbourne Victory on 23 May 2015.

Career statistics

Jordan Brown played a total of 6 Matches in his professional soccer career. Up until 2021, he never starts on the starting XI and is always subbed in for another player. Jordan Brown as of 2021, finished his career without having to score any goals or assist against the opposition team.

See also

List of select Jewish football (association; soccer) players

References

External links
 Melbourne Victory Profile

1996 births
Living people
Jewish Australian sportspeople
Jewish footballers
Australian people of Israeli descent
Association football midfielders
Melbourne Victory FC players
A-League Men players
National Premier Leagues players
Soccer players from Melbourne
Australian Institute of Sport soccer players
People educated at Caulfield Grammar School
Australian soccer players